Meridian Match is a Bulgarian daily sports newspaper, concentrating particularly on football.
Meridian Match and Darik Radio are the predominant sources of sports news in Bulgaria.

External links

 Official web site

Daily newspapers published in Bulgaria
Sports mass media in Bulgaria
Sports newspapers

bg:Меридиан мач